Warren Township, Illinois may refer to one of the following townships:

 Warren Township, Jo Daviess County, Illinois
 Warren Township, Lake County, Illinois

See also

Warren Township (disambiguation)

Illinois township disambiguation pages